Moriz is a masculine given name which may refer to:

 Moriz Haupt (1808–1874), German philologist
 Moriz Heider (1816–1866), Austrian dentist
 Moriz Henneberger (1878–1959), Swiss chess master
 Moriz von Kuffner (1854–1939), Jewish-Austrian industrialist, art collector, mountaineer and philanthropist
 Moriz Lieber (1790–1860), German Catholic politician and publisher
 Moriz Ludassy (1825–1885), Hungarian journalist
 Moriz von Lyncker (1853–1932), Prussian officer and Chief of the Military Cabinet of Kaiser Wilhelm II
 Moriz Pollack von Borkenau (1827–1904), Jewish-Austrian financier
 Moriz Probst (1867–1923), Austrian psychiatrist and neuroanatomist
 Moriz Rosenthal (1862–1946), Jewish-American pianist of Austro-Hungarian origin
 Moriz Scheyer (1886–1949), Austrian author
 Moriz Seeler (1896–1942), German poet, writer, film producer and man of the theatre
 Moriz Winternitz (1863–1937), Austrian Orientalist

See also
 Moritz (disambiguation)

Masculine given names